Demetrio Steffè (born 30 July 1996) is an Italian footballer who plays as a midfielder for  club Potenza.

Club career
Steffè made his professional debut in the Lega Pro for Savona on 26 September 2015, in a game against Teramo.

On 5 October 2020 he moved to Cesena on a one-season contract with an extension option.

International
Steffè represented the Italy national under-17 football team at the 2013 UEFA European Under-17 Championship, where Italy finished as runners-up, and at the 2013 FIFA U-17 World Cup.

References

External links
 
 

1996 births
Living people
Footballers from Trieste
Italian footballers
Association football midfielders
Serie C players
Inter Milan players
Savona F.B.C. players
S.S. Teramo Calcio players
A.C.N. Siena 1904 players
Trapani Calcio players
U.S. Triestina Calcio 1918 players
Cesena F.C. players
Potenza Calcio players
Italy youth international footballers